The Last Seven is a 2010 British science fiction thriller film starring Danny Dyer.

Synopsis
Set in an eerie post-apocalyptic London, the film tells the story of seven people who are the only remaining survivors after an unspecified cataclysmic event has wiped out the Earth's entire population. As they struggle to understand what has happened to them, the seven are hunted down one by one by a mysterious demonic power.

Cast

 Danny Dyer as Angel of Death
 Tamer Hassan as Jack Mason
 Simon Phillips as William Blake
 Ronan Vibert as Isaac
 Sebastian Street as Robert Kendrick
 Daisy Head as Chloe Chambers
 Rita Ramnani as Isabelle
 John Mawson as Henry Chambers

Release
It was released in the UK on 27 August 2010.

Reception 
The film has a 0% critics' score on Rotten Tomatoes.

References

External links 
 

2010 films
2010s science fiction thriller films
2010 psychological thriller films
British science fiction thriller films
British psychological thriller films
Films set in the future
Films set in London
Films shot in London
British post-apocalyptic films
2010s English-language films
2010s British films